José Moreira is a footballer.

José Moreira may also refer to:

José Moreira (swimmer)
José Carlos Moreira, Brazilian sprinter
José Hermes Moreira
José Moreira (athlete) in 2009 World Championships in Athletics – Men's Marathon
José Antônio Moreira, Count of Ipanema
José Alberto Tavares Moreira

See also
José Moreiras